is a private junior college in Saga, Saga, Japan.

History 
It was chartered as a college in 1963 and renamed  with the Department of Food and Nutrition Studies. In 1968 the college foundation, Nagahara Educational Corporation, established Saga Kasei University (renamed Nishikyushu University in 1974). In April 2009 the junior college was renamed Nishikyushu University Junior College.

References

External links 
 

Educational institutions established in 1946
Private universities and colleges in Japan
Japanese junior colleges
Universities and colleges in Saga Prefecture
1946 establishments in Japan